Persisteng (stands for Persatuan Sepakbola Indonesia Sumba Tengah) is a Indonesian football team based in Anakalang Field, Central Sumba Regency, East Nusa Tenggara. They currently compete in the Liga 3.

References

External links

Central Sumba Regency
Football clubs in East Nusa Tenggara
Association football clubs established in 2007
2007 establishments in Indonesia